Lone Pine Publishing is an BC-based book publisher, best known across Canada and parts of the United States for its gardening books, bird guides and nature guides. Lone Pine Publishing was founded in 1980 when Canadian broadcaster and journalist Grant Kennedy set up the company in Edmonton and published the firm’s first book, entitled The Albertans. Since then, Lone Pine Publishing has published over 600 titles. The company also distributes books for a number of smaller Canadian and U.S. publishers through an extensive network of independent booksellers and other retailers, marketing in all Canadian provinces except Quebec and in the U.S. Pacific Northwest, California and the Great Lakes states. Lone Pine Publishing maintains head office operations in Vancouver, British Columbia and central warehouse operations in Edmonton, Alberta, Canada, as well as a sales office and warehouse in Tukwila, Washington, USA. The company maintains a network of satellite warehouses across Canada.

References
 George Melnyk, The Literary History of Alberta:From Writing-on-Stone to World War II, University of Alberta Press, 1998, p. 174.
 Tim Christison, "Do We Really Need An Alberta Book Publishing Industry?", article, Alberta Views magazine, pp. 27 – 31, September–October issue, 2001.

External links
 Book Publishers Association of Alberta
 Lone Pine Publishing

Book publishing companies of Canada
Companies based in Edmonton
Publishing companies established in 1980
Culture of Edmonton